Alcopop (or cooler in Canadian English or spirit cooler in South Africa) is a colloquial term describing certain flavored alcoholic beverages, including:
 malt beverages to which various fruit juices or other flavorings have been added
 beverages containing wine to which ingredients such as fruit juice or other flavorings have been added (wine coolers)
 beverages containing distilled alcohol and added ingredients such as fruit juices or other flavorings

Beer-based

Bourbon whiskey-based

Rum-based

Scotch whisky-based

Vodka-based

Other 

 D/C = Discontinued

See also
 Alcopop

References

Alcopops
Alcoholic drink brands
Premixed alcoholic drinks
Drug-related lists
Comparison of psychoactive substances